Kinkeeping is the act of maintaining and strengthening familial ties. It is a form of emotional labor done both out of a sense of obligation and because of emotional attachment. Sociologist Carolyn Rosenthal defined the term in her 1985 article, "Kinkeeping in the Familial Division of Labor".

Kinkeeping activities help extended family members of differing households stay in touch with one another and strengthen intergenerational bonds. Methods may include telephoning, writing letters, visiting, sending gifts, acting as a caregiver for disabled or infirm family members, or providing economic aid. Women are more likely to act as kinkeepers than men and often organize family events and reunions. A 2006 survey of three different cohorts of Americans including those born before 1930, 1946–1964, and 1965–1976 found that women reported more contact with relatives than men in every cohort.

References

Interpersonal relationships
Family